The following is a list of the Dukes of Braganza, one of the most important noble titles, and later royal title, in the Kingdom of Portugal

List of the Dukes of Braganza
Note: The blue shade means that the person was not officially created Duke of Braganza, the person only claimed the title.

Before accession to the throne

As first in line to the throne of Portugal

Post-monarchy use

The Miguelist heir apparent, claiming the title of Prince of Beira, is Afonso de Santa Maria (b. 1996).

See also
 Duke of Braganza
 Portuguese nobility
 Duke of Barcelos
 Duke of Guimarães
 List of Portuguese monarchs
 List of Portuguese Dukedoms
 Kings of Portugal family tree
 House of Braganza
 Timeline of Portuguese history
 List of Duchesses of Braganza

External links
Genealogy of the Dukes of Braganza in Portuguese

Bibliography
"Nobreza de Portugal e Brasil", Vol. II, pages 433/449. Published by Zairol Lda., 1989, Lisbon.

Dukes of Braganza
Braganza
Braganza